Manjit Indira (24 February 1950) is an Indian poet and writer of Punjabi descent. Her first book Antahkaran was published in 1974.

life 
Manjit Indira was born to Harbhajan Singh Kalsi on 24 February 1950. She received her education up to M.A. (Punjabi), and MPhil.

Books

Poetry collections
1. anthkaran 1974

2. Kala Bag  1986

3. Candre Hanere 1992

4. Taryan Da Chhajj 1994, 
   2022

5. Poorti Apoorti  1996

6. Tu Awaz Mari Hai 2003
   (Poetic Novel)

7. Alakh   2006

8. Roh Vidroh  2012

9. Taandav   2016

10.Saleeban  2022

Prose :

11.Teean Teej Deena 

    (Details from 
     Folklore of Punjab) 
     1990

Criticism :-

12. Jang Hind Punjab Da - 
   A Critical Study 
    1988
13. Shiv-Kav - Criticism 
   1989

Translated Work :-

14. Twilight Zone 
   (Selected Poetry 
   Edited Transcribed by 
   Pardeep Joshi) 2018
15.Tender Twinges 
   (Selected Poetry 
   Edited & Translated by 
   Asror Allayarov) 2018
16.Safar Bin Manzil 
   (Translation of Taryan 
   Da Chhajj into Hindi 
   by well known Urdu 
   Writer Janab Ratan 
   Singh)  2019
17.Taryan Da Chhajj 
   (Shahmukhi - Urdu) 
    2022
18. Shiv Kav    
   (Shahmukhi - Urdu) 
    2022
19. Popular Poem : "Buha 
    Na Bari Na Koi 
    Banera" 

    Translated 
    into all State 
    Languages of India)
    2018

She Translated Books from other religional Languages (few of them popular books) :-

1. Jungle DeDavedar 
   (Bangla Novel) 
   Mahansaweta Devi 
   (For Language 
   Department Punjab)
2. Akhin Dekhi (Gijjubhai 
   Badheka) Nehru 1986
   Children Library (NBT)
3. Baraf De Aadmi 
  (Suryanath Singh) Nehru 
   Children Library (NBT) 
   2009
4. Prithviraj Monga - 
   Edited Stories (NBT) 
   2012
5. Lokan Nu Sarab-saresht 
   Kiven Banaiye  (Elan 
   Loye Mengnis) (Lok 
   Geet Publications) 
   2012
6. Amiri Di Chabi 
   (Napoleon Hill) (Lok 
   Geet Publications) 
   2013
7. Sheeshe Da Ghar - 
   Vijay Rathore 
   (Transcribed into 
   Punjabi from Hindi - 
   Lok Geet Publications) 
   2015
8. Agan Sakhi (Malayalam 
   Novel) - Lalithaminbka 
   Anterjanam (Sahitya 
   Akademi Delhi) 2017
9. Guandhi (Malayalam 
   Novel) - P.Keshavdutt  
  (Sahitya Akademi Delhi) 
   2021

References

External links 
 https://web.archive.org/web/20160504183803/http://www.indianwriters.org/chandigarh/manjit_indira.htm 
 https://www.youtube.com/watch?v=nlGM1zgaywU
 https://www.youtube.com/watch?v=4cmGEQri04c
 https://www.youtube.com/watch?v=8CULIww8CTg

Punjabi-language poets
1950 births
Living people